Vlad Bilețchi (born 7 September 1994 in Chișinău) is a Moldovan lawyer and politician. He is an activist for the unification of Romania and Moldova and president of the Moldovan branch of the Alliance for the Union of Romanians (AUR) political party.

Personal life
Bilețchi was born on 7 September 1994 in Chișinău, Moldova. He was born into a family of intellectuals, with his grandfather being the Moldovan historian and literary critic , from whom he claims to have inherited his "love" for "the tricolor" (the Romanian flag) and the Romanian nation. After finishing his Baccalaureate, Vlad Bilețchi studied at the Economics Faculty of the Moldova State University and specialized in business and administration, getting his degree in 2016 and later obtaining a master's degree in public law while studying at the Law Faculty of the same university.

Activism
Bilețchi is president of the unionist (with Romania) organization Public Association Union – ODIP, which he founded in 2014. This organization started in 2017 an information campaign about a possible union between Moldova and Romania to spread awareness in the country, starting in Chișinău in June and later spreading to localities of 13 different districts of Moldova from July to August through the so-called "Union Caravans". This campaign was successful, with about 100 people going to around 300 Moldovan localities. Bilețchi determined that there were people supporting the union in all these localities and that his goal in the future was to increase their number.

Bilețchi was one of the main organizers of a pro-union march with Romania in Chișinău on 25 March 2018 and of the 2018 Centenary March.

In 2019, Bilețchi and Union – ODIP participated in a campaign to rebuild the Kindergarten-Gymnasium Dimitrie Cantemir in the village of Aluatu and provide it with teaching material. The school was then the only school teaching in Romanian in the Taraclia District. Union – ODIP donated clothes, toys and books for the pupils, while an economic agent from Romania donated and installed the necessary equipment for the presence of WiFi in the school. Other rebuilding works were financially backed by the Governments of Moldova and Romania.

Political career
In the 2019 Moldovan parliamentary election, Bilețchi postulated as a candidate for the Liberal Party of Moldova although he was not part of the party.

In March 2020, he joined the Alliance for the Union of Romanians (AUR), a political party from Romania. He will run as a candidate for the Moldovan branch of the party during the 2021 Moldovan parliamentary election.

Bilețchi has criticized Igor Dodon and his 2021 statements in which he threatened to expel the ambassadors of western countries (including Romania) and the European Union (EU) in Moldova. On the 29th anniversary of the Transnistria War, Bilețchi and Union – ODIP protested in front of the Russian embassy in Chișinău about the presence of Russian troops in Transnistria and demanded their withdrawal.

References

1994 births
Living people
Moldovan politicians
Moldovan lawyers
Politicians from Chișinău
Alliance for the Union of Romanians politicians